Wonhae-class Offshore Patrol Vessels are a class of six ships being built for the Philippines Navy by Hyundai Heavy Industries (HHI) at its Ulsan shipyard in South Korea. The last will be completed in 2028.

NOTE: The name Wonhae 원해 is provisional, as it is a Korean language term with the meaning "deep waters".

Design
The ships will be:
 2,400 tonnes
 94.4 metres long
 14.3 meters wide
maximum speed 
 cruising speed of 
 cruising range

Armament and systems
The OPVs will have:
 a 76mm main gun
 two 30mm secondary guns
 a helideck capable of operating a helicopter and unmanned aerial vehicles.

Contract signing
The contracts worth (KRW)744.9 billion Won (US$573.8 million) were signed at the Philippine Department of National Defense in Manila on 28 June 2022, in the presence of Philippine Defense Secretary Delfin N. Lorenzana, Chief of Staff of the Armed Forces of the Philippines General Andres Centino, Philippine Navy Vice Commander Caesar Bernard N. Valencia, Korea Shipbuilding and Offshore Engineering (KSOE) President Ka Sam-hyun, HHI Naval & Special Ship Business Unit Chief Operating Officer Nam Sang-hoon and Ambassador of the Republic of Korea to the Philippines Kim In-chul.

References

Philippine Navy
Ships of the Philippine Navy